The 2022 Winnipeg Blue Bombers season was the 64th season for the team in the Canadian Football League (CFL) and their 89th season overall. The Blue Bombers entered the season as the two-time defending Grey Cup champions after winning both the 107th and 108th Grey Cup games. The team qualified for the playoffs following their 12th game of the season after defeating the Saskatchewan Roughriders in the Labour Day Classic on September 4, 2022. The team then clinched first place in the division in week 18 following their victory over the Edmonton Elks on October 8, 2022. The Blue Bombers reached the 109th Grey Cup, but were not able to perform the three-peat and lost to the Toronto Argonauts 24–23.

The 2022 CFL season was the eighth season under head coach Mike O'Shea and the eighth full season under general manager Kyle Walters.

Offseason

Players lost

CFL Global Draft
The 2022 CFL Global Draft took place on May 3, 2022. With the format being a snake draft, the Blue Bombers selected sixth in the odd-numbered rounds and fourth in the even-numbered rounds.

CFL National Draft
The 2022 CFL Draft took place on May 3, 2022. The Blue Bombers were scheduled to have the last selection in each of the eight rounds of the draft after winning the Grey Cup in the previous season. However, the team had two fewer selection after acquiring Cameron Lawson from the Montreal Alouettes in a trade for a first-round pick and Sergio Castillo from the BC Lions for a third-round pick.

Preseason

Schedule

Regular season

Standings

Schedule

Post-season

Schedule

Team

Roster

Coaching staff

References

External links
 

Winnipeg Blue Bombers seasons
2022 Canadian Football League season by team